The 1908–09 season was the 10th season for FC Barcelona.

Squad

Results

External links

References

FC Barcelona seasons
Barcelona